The Roman Catholic Diocese of Naval (Lat: Dioecesis  Navaliensis) is a diocese of the Roman Rite of the Latin Church of the Catholic Church in the Philippines.  Its cathedral is in Naval, Biliran in the Eastern Visayas. Its territory includes whole island of Biliran and the northwestern tip of Leyte Province.

Erected in 1988, the diocese was created from territory of the Roman Catholic Archdiocese of Palo, to which the diocese remains a suffragan.  The first appointed bishop was Filomeno 

Bactol (1988–2017). On October 13, 2017, his retirement was accepted by the Pope two years after reaching the mandatory age of 75. Pope Francis appointed RC. ex Ramirez, a priest from Archdiocese of Palo, as the new bishop of Naval. His episcopal ordination took place at the Palo Metropolitan Cathedral on January 9, 2018. He was canonically installed on January 12, 2018 at Naval Cathedral. Ramirez is the second bishop of the diocese.

The Cathedral School of La Naval was established in 1990 AD. It is the first catholic school in the diocese.

Marvyn Abrea Maceda, the bishop of the Roman Catholic Diocese of San Jose de Antique in the Antique province of the Philippines, grew up in the Naval diocese and was a priest of the diocese before becoming the bishop of San Jose.

Ordinaries

See also
Catholic Church in the Philippines

References

Naval
Naval
Religion in Biliran
Roman Catholic dioceses and prelatures established in the 20th century
Christian organizations established in 1988
1988 establishments in the Philippines